The Flash: Vertical Velocity are either two rollercoasters located at Six Flags amusement parks:

 The Flash: Vertical Velocity located at Six Flags Great America.
 The Flash: Vertical Velocity located at Six Flags Discovery Kingdom.